Marvel Super Heroes may refer to:

 Marvel Super-Heroes (comics), several Marvel Comics publications
 Marvel Super Heroes (video game), a 1995 arcade game
 Marvel Super Heroes: War of the Gems, a 1996 platform game
 Marvel Super Heroes (role-playing game), a 1984 role-playing game
 Marvel Super Heroes Adventure Game, a 1998 role-playing game
 The Marvel Super Heroes, a 1960s animated television series
 The Mighty World of Marvel, a 1972 UK comics series which was renamed Marvel Superheroes from 1979 to 1983
 Lego Marvel Super Heroes, a 2013 video game based on the Lego franchise

See also
 List of Marvel Comics characters